A ski is a long, flat device worn on the feet designed to help the wearer slide smoothly over snow.

Ski may also refer to:

Skiing, gliding on skis
Surf ski, a long kayak commonly used in open water
Ski (driving stunt), driving a car balanced on two wheels
Ski (record producer)
Ski (drink), a soft drink
Ski, Norway, a town and a municipality in Akershus county, Norway
Ski Inn, a bar in Bombay Beach, California
Water skiing, skiing on water, pulled by a boat
Ski, a magazine published by Outside (company)
Ski, a yogurt and fruit mousse brand owned by Nestlé
-ski, a common ending of Polish surnames

The abbreviation SKI may refer to:
Skipton railway station
SKI combinator calculus, a technique used in functional programming
SKI protein
Spending the Kids' Inheritance (SKI, SKI'ing), see Consumption (economics)